Tongliang District is a district of Chongqing Municipality, China. On 6 June 2014 Tongliang was upgraded from a county into a district within Chongqing.

Administrative divisions

Climate

2004 attack

On November 18, 2004, 41-year-old Yuan Daizhong, who was having a dispute with his wife, stabbed her to death at their village home, and then blew up 42 people in a tea house, killing himself and 14 other people. Twenty-eight people were injured in the blast. The attack happened on the ninth anniversary of the Zhaodong massacre.

Education

Chongqing Tongliang NO.1 Experimental Primary School is among the best primary schools of Chongqing.

Chongqing Tongliang NO.2 Experimental Primary School is in this district.

Chongqing Bachuan International High School is a private school in the district, which is known as an expert of junior and high school education.

Chongqing Tongliang Bachuan Middle School.

Tongliang Zhong Xue is the best high school in Tongliang district. It has a long history and have cultivated a large amount of talents for the top Universities in China.

References

External links
 Official website of Tongliang County Government

Districts of Chongqing